Brophy is an Irish surname of ancient origin, which is derived from the Irish "Uí Bhróithe" or "Ó Bróithe" septs that were located mostly around Ballybrophy, Laois, and in counties Carlow and Kilkenny. The family has been prominent in the history of Ireland for nearly 1000 years and has included petty kings (Rí), clerics, soldiers, and writers. The family was first mentioned in the late 11th century, but as a member of the Dál Birn dynasty, its semi-legendary genealogy stretches back to AD 200 according to the Bodleian Library, MS Rawlinson B 502. As such, it remains one of Ireland's oldest extant pre-Norman Conquest noble families.

The ancestral seat of the family chief became Ballybrophy (historically Ballybrohy, from ) after the Norman Invasion of Ireland in the 12th century.

Giolla na Naomh Ó hUidhrín wrote in the 14th century that the earliest ancestor of the Brophys was Sedna, the great-grandson of the semi-legendary pre-Christian founder of the Kingdom of Ossory, Óengus Osrithe.

In The Book of Rights, the Osraige are labelled as Síl mBresail Bric ("the seed of Bresail Bric") after Bressail Bricc, a remote ancestor of the Ossorians.  Bressail Bricc had two sons; Lughaidh, ancestor of the Laigan, and Connla, from whom the Ossorians sprang, through Óengus Osrithe. Thus, the people of Osraige were also sometimes collectively referred to as Clann Connla.

"The Annals of the Four Masters" records the death of Gilla Molua O'Brophy (Ua Bruaidheada) of Rath Tamnaighe (Lisdowney, Kilkenny) in 1069. The "Annals of Ulster" mentions that Connor O'Brophy (Conchobar Ua Broighthe), King of Ceann Chaille, and Domhnall Mac Gilla Patraic, King of Upper Ossory, were slain by the O'Moores in 1165.
Giolla na Naomh Ó hUidhrín mentions the O'Brophys as residing in Magh Sedna (the Plain of Sedna) in the barony of Galmoy (barony), Kilkenny in his 14th century work, "Tuilleadh feasa ar Éirinn óigh." The name of Galmoy (barony), in Irish Gabhalmhaigh, means "plain of the Branch, or Ghabhal" (River Goul). Magh Sedna Was also known as Aos-Chinn-chaille, i.e., [the territory of] the people of Cean Chaille.

Magh Sedna is a fertile part of Ireland which the Danes invaded in the ninth century, and where the Normans came after they had conquered Britain in the eleventh
century. Over the years the Norse, Norman and Gaelic bloods have mingled in the families of later centuries. It
is the paradoxical story of Ireland that the conquered frequently absorbed their conquerors through intermarriage,
language and customs. Hence the oppressors of one generation often produced the rebels of a later one.

William O'Brothe was appointed Prior of the Augustinian Monastery of St. Tigernacius of Aghamacart by Pope Sixtus IV on 31 March 1481. William is likely to have been the illegitimate son of Philip O'Brothe, Abbot of Kilcooley Abbey, whom Pope Pius II legitimised and instructed to be taken on as a monk at the Abby after his father's death.

When Florence Fitzpatrick, 3rd Baron Upper Ossory, the son of the last person to have claim to the kingship of Osraige, was pardoned by Queen Elizabeth I in 1601, his kinsmen, the Brophys and other "old tribesman of Upper Ossory," were also mentioned in the pardon. Ui Broithe was  anglicised as O'Broghie in the Patent Rolls of James I in 1603 and 1607. The name appears as Brohy in census of 1659.

Their territory comprised the level portion of the barony of Galmoy, in the county of Kilkenny. They were driven from the plain of Magh Sedna into Upper Ossory, after the Norman invasion of Ireland, and their chief settled at Ballybrophy, near Borris-in-Ossory, in Queen's County (now County Laois).

At Christmas 1626 Charles I granted his favourite, George Villiers, Duke of Buckingham, Borris-in-Ossory, "Ballybrophy, Grangemore, &c., &c. ; all of which he erected into a manor to be called the Manor of Villiers".

Notable individuals with the surname include:

 Alfred Brophy, American academic
 Bernie Brophy (1903–1982), Canadian ice hockey player
 Brigid Brophy, Lady Levey (1929–1995), English writer, philosopher and critic
 Drew Brophy, American surfboard artist
 Eamonn Brophy, Scottish footballer
 Edward Brophy (1895–1960), American character actor
 Frank Brophy (1900–1930), Canadian ice hockey player
 Gerard Brophy, South African and British cricketer
 Greg Brophy, American politician
 Harry Brophy (born ), English football player and coach
 Hugh Brophy, Irish football player
Jane Brophy (born 1963), British politician
 Jay Brophy, American football player
 Jed Brophy, New Zealand actor
 Kevin Brophy, American actor
 Niall Brophy (born 1935), Irish and British Lions rugby player
 Paul Brophy (1937–1986), American firefighter
 Philip Brophy, Australian artist
 Sally Brophy (1928–2007), American actress
 Therese Brophy (born 1976), Irish camogie player

See also 
 Brophy, a fictional character in the 1977 comedy film High Anxiety
 Brophy, a fictional character (minor as police sergeant) in 1944 comedy film with Cary Grant Arsenic and Old Lace

References

Anglicised Irish-language surnames
Surnames of Irish origin